The 2018 Campeonato da Primeira Divisão de Futebol Profissional da FGF (2018 FGF First Division Professional Football Championship), better known as the 2015 Campeonato Gaúcho or  Gaúcho, was the 97th edition of the top flight football league of the Brazilian state of Rio Grande do Sul. The season began in January and ended in April.

Participating teams

Table

Knockout stage

Bracket

Final

Goals

Awards

Team of the year 

Manager: Beto Campos

Player of the Season
The Player of the Year was awarded to Matheus.

Newcomer of the Season
The Newcomer of the Year was awarded to Sander.

References 

Campeonato Gaúcho seasons